Colin Kaminsky (born May 27, 1999) is an American racing driver. He currently competes in Indy NXT driving for Abel Motorsports. He previously competed in the Indy Pro 2000 Championship with Pabst Racing.

Racing record

Racing career summary 

* Season still in progress.

SCCA National Championship Runoffs results

American open-wheel racing results

U.S. F2000 National Championship
(key) (Races in bold indicate pole position) (Races in italics indicate fastest lap) (Races with * indicate most race laps led)

Indy Pro 2000 Championship 
(key) (Races in bold indicate pole position) (Races in italics indicate fastest lap) (Races with * indicate most race laps led)

Indy NXT

* Season still in progress.

References 

1999 births
Living people
Racing drivers from Chicago
Racing drivers from Illinois
U.S. F2000 National Championship drivers

Indy Pro 2000 Championship drivers
SCCA National Championship Runoffs participants
Indy Lights drivers